Bruno Loi (born August 23, 1941) is a retired Italian Army lieutenant general, who served as commander of the Italian forces in UNOSOM II from May to September 1993.

Career

Service in Somalia
Loi was infuriated as the result of an American operation in the Italian zone of control on June 22, 1993, since it took place without his permission. Loi was the commanding officer for the Italian forces in the Battle of Checkpoint Pasta. He later re-occupied Checkpoint Pasta after the battle, to do this he used diplomacy to persuade Somali general Mohamed Farrah Aidid to withdraw, annoying the United States, who viewed diplomacy as a waste of effort and advocated a forceful solution. The United Nations asked Italy to remove Loi from his position in July on charges of insubordination, a request which Italy denied. These incidents contributed to a considerable straining of relations between Italy and the rest of the United Nations peacekeeping force. Loi served out the rest of his term as commander, returning to Italy in September.

References

Italian generals
United Nations military personnel
Living people
1941 births
Recipients of the National Order of the Cedar
Italian military attachés